Arabian Nights and Days (1979) is a novel by Egyptian writer Naguib Mahfouz, winner of the Nobel Prize for Literature. The novel serves as a sequel and companion piece for One Thousand and One Nights and includes many of the same characters that appeared in the original work such as Shahryar, Scheherazade, and Aladdin.

References

Novels by Naguib Mahfouz
1979 novels
1995 novels
Arabic-language novels
Works based on One Thousand and One Nights
Doubleday (publisher) books
Novels based on fairy tales